El Norra Alila is the second full-length studio album by the Israeli metal band Orphaned Land, released on July 18, 1996 by Holy Records. It is the band's first concept album. The album was reissued as a deluxe edition in July 2006 as a 10-year-anniversary for the album and contains extras; the song "Disciples of the Sacred Oath" and video clips of "Ornaments of Gold" and "The Evil Urge".

Album meaning and concept
There are religious translations within the album name, "Nor" means "the light" in Arabic, "Alila" meaning "the night", "El" meaning "God" in Hebrew and "Norra" meaning "terrible", and "Alila" meaning "tale". This means that the album can be translated as; "God of Light – Evil of the Night" and gives reference to its concept.

The name is a pun on El Nora Alila, a popular Sephardic piyyut, which is sung during Ne'ilah of Yom Kippur.

Track listing
"Find Yourself, Discover God" – 6:15
"Like Fire to Water" – 4:46
"The Truth Within" – 4:34
"The Path Ahead" – 4:16
"A Neverending Way" – 2:06
"Takasim" – 1:13
"Thee by the Father I Pray" – 3:11
"Flawless Belief" – 6:46
"Joy" – 0:42
"Whisper My Name When You Dream" – 4:35
"Shir Hama'Alot" – 5:02
"El Meod Na'Ala" – 2:22
"Of Temptation Born" – 4:42
"The Evil Urge" – 16:07
"Shir Hashirim " – 1:58

Deluxe Edition
 "Disciples of the Sacred Oath"
 "Ornaments of Gold" (video clip)
 "The Evil Urge" (video clip)

Credits

Band members
 Kobi Farhi – vocals
 Yossi Sasi – lead guitars
 Matti Svatitzki – rhythm guitar
 Uri Zelcha – bass
 Sami Bachar – drums

Session members and guests
 Hadas Sasi – female vocals
 Amira Salah – Arab female vocals
 Abraham Salman – kannun
 Avi Agababa – zil, bendir, tar, dumbek, darbuka, tambourine
 Sivan Zelikoff – violin
 Yariv Malka – sampler, shofar
 Felix Mizrahi – violin
 Avi Sharon – oud, backing vocals
 David Sasi – vocals, backing vocals
 Unknown musician goes by the name "Vovin" – Guitars

Production and other
 Lyrics by Orphaned Land, Alon Miasnikov, Traditional
 Music by Orphaned Land, Traditional
 Production by Kobi Farhi, Yossi Sassi
 Engineered by Udi Koomran
 Assistant and Producers: Ran Carmeli, Yuval Segal, Yaniv Barzilai, Gerry Gani
 Mastering by Ran Bagno, Udi Koomran
 Arrangement by Udi Koomran, Kobi Farhi, Yossi Sassi
 "Shir Hashirim" recorded in The Infinite Studios by Yariv Malka.
 Cover art by: Ehud Graf

1996 albums
Orphaned Land albums
Concept albums
Holy Records albums